The Andong Jang clan is a Korean clan with a bon-gwan located in Andong, North Gyeongsang Province. According to the census held in 2015, the population of the Andong Jang clan was 39,939. Their founder was  who was a powerful clan in Later Three Kingdoms. Jang Jeong pil was one of the three highest civil posts who made an achievement with Gim Seon pyeong  and Gwon Haeng when Taejo of Goryeo conquered Gyeon Hwon in Later Baekje. Jang Jeong pil's ancestor was a Chinese and moved in Korea in the end of Silla.

See also 
 Korean clan names of foreign origin

References

External links 
 

 
Korean clan names of Chinese origin